Ustrasana (IAST: Uṣṭrāsana), Ushtrasana, or Camel Pose is a kneeling back-bending asana in modern yoga as exercise.

Etymology and origins

The name comes from the Sanskrit words उष्ट्र Uṣṭra, "camel", and आसन, Asana meaning "posture" or "seat".

A different (standing) pose is given the name Ushtrasana in the 19th century Sritattvanidhi. The modern pose is described in the 20th century by two of Krishnamacharya's pupils, Pattabhi Jois in his Ashtanga Vinyasa Yoga, and B. K. S. Iyengar in his Light on Yoga.

Description

Ustrasana is a deep backward bend from a kneeling position; the completed pose has the hands on the heels. The backs of the feet may be flat on the floor, or the toes may be tucked under for a slightly less strong backbend.

The pose is one of the 26 asanas in the Bikram Yoga sequence.

Variations

The name Ardha Ustrasana, Half Camel pose, is given to two different poses. One is an easier modification with the hands on the hips; the other has one hand on the heel on the same side, as in the full pose, and the other arm stretched back over the head.

The pose can be modified by providing supports such as yoga bricks beside the calves for the hands.

See also

 List of asanas

References

Sources

 
 

Backbend asanas